Liblice is a village and administrative part of Český Brod in the Central Bohemian Region of the Czech Republic.

It has a population of 837 (2011).

History
The first written mention of Liblice is from 1344.

Sights
Liblice is known for its broadcasting facility: 
 RKS Liblice 1-transmitter
 RKS Liblice 2-transmitter (Its two 355 m masts are the tallest towers used for mediumwave broadcasting in the world and also the tallest structure in the Czech Republic).

References

External links
Website of Liblice

Neighbourhoods in the Czech Republic
Villages in Kolín District